Gmina Annopol is an urban-rural gmina (administrative district) in Kraśnik County, Lublin Voivodeship, in eastern Poland.

Villages
Apart from the town of Annopol, Gmina Annopol contains the villages and settlements of Anielin, Annopol-Rachów, Baraki, Bliskowice, Bliskowice-Niedbałki, Borów, Dąbrowa, Grabówka, Grabówka Ukazowa, Grabówka Ukazowa-Hamówka, Grabówka-Kolonia, Huta, Jakubowice, Janiszów, Kopiec, Kosin, Natalin, Nowy Rachów, Opoczka Mała, Opoka Duża, Opoka-Kolonia, Opoka-Kolonia Józefin, Opoka-Kolonia Michalin, Popów, Stary Rachów, Sucha Wólka, Świeciechów Duży, Świeciechów Poduchowny, Świeciechów Poduchowny-Lasek, Świeciechów Poduchowny-Zychówki, Wymysłów, Zabełcze, Zastocze, and Zofipole.

Neighbouring gminas
Gmina Annopol is bordered by the gminas of Dzierzkowice, Gościeradów, Józefów nad Wisłą, Ożarów, Radomyśl nad Sanem, Tarłów, and Zawichost.

References

External links
Polish official population figures 2006

External links
 The old website (archived)

Annopol
Kraśnik County